Adolfo Romero Lainas (born 12 October 1958) is a Mexican politician affiliated with the PRD. He currently serves as Senator of the LXII Legislature of the Mexican Congress representing Oaxaca.

References

1958 births
Living people
Politicians from Oaxaca
Members of the Senate of the Republic (Mexico)
Party of the Democratic Revolution politicians
21st-century Mexican politicians
Universidad Veracruzana alumni